In mathematics, an identity is an equality relating one mathematical expression A to another mathematical expression B, such that A and B (which might contain some variables) produce the same value for all values of the variables within a certain range of validity. In other words, A = B is an identity if A and B define the same functions, and an identity is an equality between functions that are differently defined. Formally, an identity is a universally quantified equality.

Common identities

Algebraic identities 

Trigonometric identities 

Geometrically, trigonometric identities are identities involving certain functions of one or more angles. They are distinct from triangle identities, which are identities involving both angles and side lengths of a triangle. Only the former are covered in this article.

These identities are useful whenever expressions involving trigonometric functions need to be simplified. Another important application is the integration of non-trigonometric functions: a common technique which involves first using the substitution rule with a trigonometric function, and then simplifying the resulting integral with a trigonometric identity.

On the other hand, the equation

For example, this equation is true when  but false when .

Another group of trigonometric identities concerns the so-called addition/subtraction formulas (e.g. the double-angle identity , the addition formula for ), which can be used to break down expressions of larger angles into those with smaller constituents.

Exponential identities 

The following identities hold for all integer exponents, provided that the base is non-zero:

Unlike addition and multiplication, exponentiation is not commutative.

Also unlike addition and multiplication, exponentiation is not associative either. When no parentheses are written, by convention the order is top-down, not bottom-up:
   whereas

Logarithmic identities 

Several important formulas, sometimes called logarithmic identities or log laws, relate logarithms to one another:

Product, quotient, power and root 
The logarithm of a product is the sum of the logarithms of the numbers being multiplied; the logarithm of the ratio of two numbers is the difference of the logarithms. The following table lists these identities with examples.

Change of base 
The logarithm logb(x) can be computed from the logarithms of x and b with respect to an arbitrary base k using the following formula:
 
Typical scientific calculators calculate the logarithms to bases 10 and e. Logarithms with respect to any base b can be determined using either of these two logarithms by the previous formula:

Given a number x and its logarithm logb(x) to an unknown base b, the base is given by:

Hyperbolic function identities 

The hyperbolic functions satisfy many identities, all of them similar in form to the trigonometric identities. In fact, Osborn's rule states that one can convert any trigonometric identity into a hyperbolic identity by expanding it completely in terms of integer powers of sines and cosines, changing sine to sinh and cosine to cosh, and switching the sign of every term which contains a product of an even number of hyperbolic sines.

The Gudermannian function gives a direct relationship between the trigonometric functions and the hyperbolic ones that does not involve complex numbers.

Logic and universal algebra 
For example, the axioms of a monoid are often given as the formulas

or, shortly,

So, these formulas are identities in every monoid. As for any equality, the formulas without quantifier are often called equations. In other words, an identity is an equation that is true for all values of the variables.

See also 
 Accounting identity
 List of mathematical identities

References

Notes

Citations

Sources

External links 
The Encyclopedia of Equation   Online encyclopedia of mathematical identities (archived)
A Collection of Algebraic Identities

Elementary algebra
 
Equivalence (mathematics)